Emma de Caunes (born 9 September 1976) is a French actress.

Life and career
De Caunes was born in Paris on 9 September 1976 as the daughter of actor and director Antoine de Caunes and director and graphic designer Gaëlle Royer. Her paternal grandparents are journalist Georges de Caunes and Jacqueline Joubert, one of the first continuity announcers on French television.

Marriage and family
De Caunes married the singer known as Sinclair in 2001. They have a daughter Nina together, born in October 2002. They divorced in 2005. 

In September 2011, De Caunes married Jamie Hewlett, an English comic book artist.

Education and career
De Caunes began acting in 1988 at the age of 12 with a role in Margot et le voleur d'enfants, a short film by director Michèle Reiser, her godmother. She obtained her French  baccalauréat in film in 1995 after high school.

De Caunes appeared in various commercials before her first major film role in 1997 in Sylvie Verheyde's Un frère. She won the Most Promising Actress award for this performance at the 1998 César awards. In 2001 she starred with Radiohead’s Thom Yorke in the music video for the song “Knives Out,” directed by Michel Gondry. She won the 2002 Prix Romy Schneider, an award given annually to a promising young actress.

She had a main role in the 2007 comedy film Mr. Bean's Holiday, in which she played an actress in an independent being made by Willem Dafoe's character.

Allegations against Weinstein
In 2017, De Caunes publicly accused Hollywood producer Harvey Weinstein of sexual misconduct at the 2010 Cannes Film Festival. She alleges that Weinstein lured her to his hotel room, and chased her around the room while he was naked in an attempt to have sex. Her allegations were first reported in The New Yorker.

Theatre

Filmography

Actress

Director / Writer

References

External links

 
 
 
 Lanester at Eurochannel
 
 

1976 births
Living people
Actresses from Paris
French film actresses
French television actresses
20th-century French actresses
21st-century French actresses
Most Promising Actress César Award winners